East Gresford is a village in the Hunter Region of New South Wales, Australia in Dungog Shire.

History
The traditional owners of the area are the Gringai clan of the Wonnarua people, a group of Indigenous Australians.

The town is probably named for Gresford in Wales.

Location

There are actually two small villages with the name 'Gresford'. There is Gresford (or West Gresford) on the Singleton side and East Gresford on the Maitland side. It appears that Gresford is the original township, as it is older and the location of the school and local Anglican church. But East Gresford is much larger and has the main shopping area. It is also home to the Gresford Scorpions Soccer Club.

The Gresford & District Community Group produces the Gresford News, a monthly four colour production which reports on activities in the district.  It has a circulation of 800.  The Community Group is also responsible for the creation of an arboretum featuring endangered and local native trees.  Now in its third year of development there is increasing interest by groups to visit and learn about these important shrubs and trees.

East Gresford is close to the Barrington Tops National Park, which includes the highest peak in the Hunter Valley and is a World Heritage site. It also snows in the area each winter. 

In 2020 the annual Gresford Show was held in March.  The highly successful Gresford Billycart Derby was run for many years on Easter Saturday. It ceased due to the Covid outbreak and will not recommence. The showground is used as a camping site as it is located  beside the Allyn River. 

More information and updates on activities can also be obtained from the monthly publication of the Gresford News which is also available on-line.

Climate
The areas surrounding East Gresford have a humid subtropical climate (Cfa) with hot summers and cool drier winters, similar to the Greater Western Sydney region.

References

External links
 SMH - Gresford - Culture and History
 Gresford Planning District
 Town website

Suburbs of Dungog Shire
Towns in the Hunter Region